Prillwitz is a small village in Mecklenburg-Vorpommern (Mecklenburg-West Pomerania), on the shores of the lake Lieps, Germany. It is part of the municipality Hohenzieritz. It lies approximately 125 kilometres north of Berlin through the B96 or 205 kilometres through the A20. The town has a church and a small castle converted into a hotel and restaurant.

See also
 Prillwitz idols

References 

Villages in Mecklenburg-Western Pomerania